Jean-Pierre Landau (born 16 November 1946) is a high-ranking French civil servant.

In 1974 he joined the General Inspection of Finances.

From 1989 to 1993, he was appointed as Executive Director for France at the International Monetary Fund and the World Bank in Washington D.C.

Back at the French General Inspection of Finances from 1996 to 1998, he then became Executive director for the French Banks Association.

From 2001 to 2006, he served as Executive Director for France at the European Bank for Reconstruction and Development, while doing financial consulting for the French Embassy in London.

From 2006 to 2011, he was Second Deputy Governor of the Banque de France, a member of the board of directors of the Bank for International Settlements (BIS) and a member of the Financial Stability Forum. He is also deputy at the G7 and G20 and member of the OECD workgroup devoted to economic and financial policy (WP3).

Since 2012, Jean-Pierre Landau participates as jury member for the Prize for Conflict Prevention awarded by the Fondation Chirac.

In January 2014, Landau wrote a Financial Times opinion piece that was critical of Bitcoin, a digital currency. He suggested that for a currency to be successful it needs a central bank to decide on changes to the money supply. If the supply of a currency is too small it will not be sufficient for the needs of an economy. He contends that because the number of Bitcoin will reach a predetermined limit the supply will be insufficient to satisfy the demand.

Publications 
 Jean-Pierre Landau, Les nouvelles contributions financières internationales : Financement et développement et taxation internationale , Paris, 2004.
 Jean-Pierre Landau, François Benaroya, L'échange international, Paris, Presses universitaires de France, coll. « Que sais-je ? », 1999, numéro 1727.
 Jean-Pierre Landau, EMU and the Franco-German relationship in David P. Calleo, Eric R. Staal, Europe's Franco-German Engine, Washington Brookings Institution Press, 1999 
 Jean-Pierre Landau,  An International Financial Architecture for the 21st Century

Also refer to
 Banque de France
 International Monetary Fund
 World Bank
 General Inspection of Finances (France)

External links and references

 http://www.banque-france.fr/gb/instit/telechar/discours/2010/International-monetary-arrangements-Pekin.pdf

1946 births
Living people
French civil servants